WSKO (1260 kHz) is a sports AM radio station in Syracuse, New York. The station is owned by Cumulus Media. It has been affiliated with CBS Sports Radio since January 2013. "The Score" is the flagship station for all Syracuse Mets baseball games.

History
WSKO signed on in 1946 as WNDR. It was the most popular Top 40-format station in the area during the 1960s. The studio and 5000-watt transmitter were located on Andrews Road in DeWitt, a Syracuse suburb. During the 1950s, the station began its run as a popular music station after beginning as a Mutual Broadcasting System affiliate. Among its 1950s-era staffers was character actor and Golden Globe nominee Aldo Ray, who worked there in 1956 during an extended break in his film career; a publicity photo of him taken at the station survives and is reproduced on a station tribute website. During the station's heyday in the late 1950s and 1960s, personalities who would later achieve success in major markets including Bud Ballou, Peter Cavanaugh (Radio DJ), Bob Shannon and Joey Reynolds were among the notable disc jockeys that worked at WNDR.

During the 1990s and early 2000s, the station struggled. It adopted the WNSS callsign in 1996, after dropping a country music format in favor of all-news under the branding of "W-News". After a brief and ill-fated 2000 change to an all-comedy radio format, the station finally settled on a mostly straight satellite feed from the ESPN Radio network, including ESPN's MLB and NBA broadcasts. The station during most of this period was the flagship station of the Syracuse Orange along with sister station WAQX, until WTKW acquired the rights in 2007.  The station was also the home of the Syracuse Chiefs from 2010 to 2012 and the Syracuse Crunch from 2010 to 2013.

Effective March 2010, ESPN Radio was dropped from WNSS (being moved to WTLA/WSGO); Imus in the Morning became WNSS's new morning show, migrating from WHEN. WNSS also rebranded as "The Score 1260", switched its network affiliation to Sporting News Radio, and increased its emphasis on local sports. The station also changed its call letters to WSKO (previously heard on a radio station in Providence, Rhode Island) to reflect this.

WSKO currently carries two local weekday programs, The Manchild Show with Boy Green, hosted by Jim 'The Manchild' Lerch and Paul 'Boy Green' Esden Jr, weekdays 10am-12noon and 'Drive Time Sports with Paul Esden' weekdays 4-6pm.  Former local programs include: On the Block with Brent Axe, 2-6pm. heard on WHEN until early 2009. Axe's program was unaffected by the station's March 2010 programming changes, with the exception of an expansion by one hour.  The Danny Parkins Show, hosted by Danny Parkins was added for the 12noon-2pm weekday shift on June 1, 2010.  In March 2011, Parkins left WSKO to take a job at KCSP 610 Sports Radio in Kansas City MO.  Midday with Mike Lindsley took over the mid-day slot on WSKO 12noon-2pm until the end of 2012, when the show became The Afternoon Drive after the departure of Brent Axe.  In late March 2013, Lindsley left WSKO to take a job at WTMM 104.5 The Team in Albany, NY.

References

External links

WNDR Syracuse Tribute Page
Peter Cavanaugh WNDR disc jockey
WNDR playlist, 1966
FCC History Cards for WSKO

Sports radio stations in the United States
SKO
Cumulus Media radio stations
Radio stations established in 1946
CBS Sports Radio stations
1946 establishments in New York (state)
Sports in Syracuse, New York
Syracuse Mets